Stigmellites is a genus of Lepidopteran fossils. It is only known from trace fossils of leaf mines.

Species
Stigmellites araliae (Fric, 1882) was described from a fossil mine in an Araliaceae species. It was found in the Czech Republic.
Stigmellites baltica (Kozlov, 1988) was described from a fossil mine in Baltic amber dated to the Eocene
Stigmellites carpini-orientalis Straus, 1977 was described from a fossil mine in Carpinus orientalis fossilis species dated to the Pliocene. It was found in Hessen, Germany.
Stigmellites heringi Kernbach, 1967  was described from a fossil mine in a Berberis species dated to the Pliocene. It was found in Hessen, Germany.
Stigmellites kzyldzharica (Kozlov, 1988) was described from a fossil mine in a Platanus species. It was found in Kazakhstan.
Stigmellites messelensis Straus, 1976 was described from a fossil mine dated to the Eocene. It was found in Messel, Germany.
Stigmellites pliotityrella Kernbach, 1967 was described from a fossil mine in Fagus silvatica dated to the Pliocene. It was found in Hessen, Germany.
Stigmellites samsonovi Kozlov, 1988 was described from a fossil mine in Trochodendroides arctica. It was found in Kazakhstan.
Stigmellites serpentina (Kozlov, 1988) was described from a fossil mine in Trochodendroides arctica. It was found in Kazakhstan.
Stigmellites sharovi (Kozlov, 1988)  was described from a fossil mine in Trochodendroides arctica. It was found in Kazakhstan.
Stigmellites tyshchenkoi (Kozlov, 1988) was described from a fossil mine in Platanus latior. It was found in Kazakhstan.
Stigmellites zelkovae Straus, 1977 was described from a fossil mine in a Zelkova species dated to the Pliocene. It was found in Hessen, Germany.

External links
Image of Stigmellites samsonovi mine on leptree.net
Stigmellites at the Paleobiology Database

†
Fossil Lepidoptera
Fossil taxa described in 1967
Oligocene insects
Baltic amber